Condylanthidae is a family of sea anemones belonging to the order Actiniaria.

Genera:
 Cadetactis Fautin, 2016
 Charisactis Ocaña & Çinar, 2018
 Charisea Torrey, 1902
 Charisella Carlgren, 1949
 Condylanthus Carlgren, 1899
 Macrocnema Carlgren, 1928
 Pseudhormathia Carlgren, 1943
 Riactis Fautin, 2016
 Segonzactis Riemann-Zürneck, 1979

References

 
Actinioidea
Cnidarian families